The following is a list of episodes of Mundo Mo'y Akin (internationally titled Deception), a Filipino drama television series created by RJ Nuevas, developed by Denoy Navarro-Punio and produced by GMA Network. It premiered on March 18, 2013 on the network's prime time block, 8:45 p.m. time slot, and on March 19, 2013 worldwide via GMA Pinoy TV. The series concluded its twenty-five-week run on September 6, 2013 with a total of 122 episodes. Michele Borja served as the executive producer while Andoy Ranay directed the show.
	
The forty-five-minute scripted drama follows a compelling storyline that explores the insatiable quest for beauty, and wealth. The main characters find themselves ensnared in a game of deceit and betrayal and will stop at anything to gain power and prestige.

Originally slated to air for sixteen weeks, the series was awarded several extensions due to its consistent good performance in the ratings game. On July 12, 2013 the series claimed the top spot in the list of most watched programs across Nation Urban Philippines, Urban Luzon and Mega Manila. Based on data from Nielsen TV Audience Measurement (overnight data), the show became the highest rating program in NUTAM with an average household rating of 27.9%. It likewise led the lists of most watched programs in Urban Luzon and Mega Manila, which represent 76 and 59 percent of the total urban TV household population in the entire country, with an average household rating of 33.2% and 36.4%, respectively. The series was also considered a critical success, positively received by viewers, writers and critics, from its premiere episode.

Series overview
The ratings indicate below are based on Mega Manila and Urban Luzon (represent 76 and 59 percent of the total urban TV household population in the entire Philippines) overnight ratings gathered by the TV ratings supplier, Nielsen TV Audience Measurement, where it consistently ranked within the top ten of the weekly television ratings. "Rank" refers to how well the show rated compared to other television series that aired that date. The "Season premiere" is the date that the first episode of the season aired, and the "Season finale" is the date that the final episode of the season aired.

Synopsis
Childhood best friends, Rodora and Perlita have always suffered from the incessant taunting and ridicule for their ugly appearances. While Perlita accepted these criticisms gracefully and is contented with her life, Rodora, on the other hand, believed that there's no future and hope for unattractive people like them. Armed with her sheer determination, Rodora works under Doña Carmen, a rich but abusive old woman. When the spinster dies of a heart attack, Rodora claims all her wealth and uses it to undergo plastic surgery. She completely put her past behind her and changes her name to Giselle.
 
Meanwhile, Perlita is willing to love any man who will accept her entirely despite her physical flaw. This leads her to trust George, a Filipino-American guy whom she believes loves her sincerely. But after one night, this guy dumps her, and takes all her money. Left with no choice but to accept her fate, Perlita works as a maid in the mansion of the Carbonels. By some twist of fate, the paths of former friends Perlita and Rodora cross again in the mansion. However, Giselle is now the wife of Ziggy, the son of Doña Charito, the matriarch of Carbonels. Unknown to Perlita, the beautiful wife of her boss is childhood best friend Rodora.
 
Soon after, Giselle and Perlita get pregnant at the same time. Giselle is anxious and concerned that her child will inherit her ugly features. And this situation will bring shame on her husband's family and will eventually reveal her true identity. Giselle's worst fears become reality when she gives birth to an ugly baby. Her world is shattered and she knows that her relationship with Ziggy is over. Perlita, on the other hand, is surprised with her cute and beautiful baby. But after giving birth, she passed out. Giselle learns from Aida, Ziggy's cousin, about Perlita's baby. Giselle conspires with Aida to switch her ugly baby with Perlita's child and in return, she will support her in the family business. Aida agrees and Giselle successfully covers up her identity and switches the two babies.
 
As years pass by, Perlita dutifully takes care of her daughter Marilyn  while Giselle raises Darlene as her own child. Marilyn and Darlene become close despite their social status. But things will turn differently when Jerome, Aida's son, who has always defended Marilyn, will fall in love with Darlene. A love triangle ensues and Darlene and Marilyn are now rivals.

List of episodes

Season 1

Season 2

External links
Official GMA Network website

References

Lists of Philippine drama television series episodes